Edna is a census-designated place in San Luis Obispo County, California. The 2010 United States census reported Edna's population was 193. It is best known for the wine industry in the Edna Valley AVA.

History
The community was founded by Dairyman Edgar Steele who purchased 58,000 acres and built a town to house his employees. In 1883 Lynford Maxwell subdivided the area and called it Maxwellton. The citizens later renamed it Edna. There was coal tar mining of bituminous rock in the 1880s and 1890s and more recently wine grape growing has become the prominent industry.

Geography
According to the United States Census Bureau, the CDP covers an area of 1.2 square miles (3.2 km2), all of it land.

The valley also includes Edna Fault, a prominent landform just south of the main community.

Demographics

The 2010 United States Census reported that Edna had a population of 193. The racial makeup of Edna was 185 (95.9%) White, 0 (0.0%) African American, 3 (1.6%) Native American, 0 (0.0%) Asian, 0 (0.0%) Pacific Islander, 5 (2.6%) from other races, and 0 (0.0%) from two or more races. Hispanic or Latino of any race were 22 persons (11.4%).

The Census reported that 193 people (100% of the population) lived in households, 0 (0%) lived in non-institutionalized group quarters, and 0 (0%) were institutionalized.

There were 69 households, out of which 22 (31.9%) had children under the age of 18 living in them, 44 (63.8%) were opposite-sex married couples living together, 2 (2.9%) had a female householder with no husband present, 2 (2.9%) had a male householder with no wife present.  There were 6 (8.7%) unmarried opposite-sex partnerships, and 0 (0%) same-sex married couples or partnerships. 15 households (21.7%) were made up of individuals, and 8 (11.6%) had someone living alone who was 65 years of age or older. The average household size was 2.80.  There were 48 families (69.6% of all households); the average family size was 3.19.

The population was spread out, with 42 people (21.8%) under the age of 18, 12 people (6.2%) aged 18 to 24, 41 people (21.2%) aged 25 to 44, 68 people (35.2%) aged 45 to 64, and 30 people (15.5%) who were 65 years of age or older.  The median age was 45.4 years. For every 100 females, there were 119.3 males.  For every 100 females age 18 and over, there were 101.3 males.

The homeowner vacancy rate was 0%; the rental vacancy rate was 5.0%.  152 people (78.8% of the population) lived in owner-occupied housing units and 41 people (21.2%) lived in rental housing units.

References

Census-designated places in San Luis Obispo County, California
Census-designated places in California